The 1956–57 Montreal Canadiens season was the club's 48th season of play. The Canadiens would place second in the league to qualify for the playoffs. The Canadiens defeated the Boston Bruins to win the Stanley Cup for the ninth time in team history and for the second year in a row.

Regular season

Final standings

Record vs. opponents

Schedule and results

Playoffs
The Canadiens qualified for the playoffs in second place. The Canadien then faced off against the New York Rangers, winning the best-of-seven series 4–1 to advance to the final against Boston.

Stanley Cup Final

Boston Bruins vs. Montreal Canadiens

Montreal wins best-of-seven series 4 games to 1

Player statistics

Regular season
Scoring

Goaltending

Playoffs
Scoring

Goaltending

Awards and records
 James Norris Memorial Trophy: || Doug Harvey
 Vezina Trophy: || Jacques Plante

Transactions

See also
 1956–57 NHL season
 List of Stanley Cup champions

References
Canadiens on Hockey Database
Canadiens on NHL Reference

Stanley Cup championship seasons
Montreal Canadiens seasons
Mon
Mon